Alex Szczotka  is a former Polish footballer and current Technical Director and head coach for the Erin Mills Soccer Club.

Playing career 
Szczotka began his career in his native Poland with Piast Gliwice in the I liga in 1986. In 1992, he signed with Toronto Italia of the Canadian National Soccer League. After retiring from professional soccer he went into coaching and served as the assistant coach for Josef Komlodi for the Mississauga Eagles FC of the Canadian Soccer League in 2011. The following season, he was promoted to head coach for Mississauga, but failed to secure a postseason berth. On January 24, 2013 Erin Mills relieved Komlodi from his position of technical director, and named Szczotka as his successor.

References 

Living people
Polish footballers
Polish expatriate footballers
Polish football managers
Piast Gliwice players
Toronto Italia players
Canadian National Soccer League players
Place of birth missing (living people)
Expatriate soccer players in Canada
Polish expatriate sportspeople in Canada
Canadian Soccer League (1998–present) managers
Association football defenders
Year of birth missing (living people)